West Woodland is a neighborhood in Seattle, Washington. The city's Department of Neighborhoods places West Woodland in the south east corner of Ballard.

References

Ballard, Seattle